The 1940 Vanderbilt Commodores football team represented Vanderbilt University during the 1940 college football season. The Commodores were led by Red Sanders, in his first season as head coach. Members of the Southeastern Conference, Vanderbilt went 3–6–1 overall and 1–5–1 in conference play.  The Commodores played their seven home games at Dudley Field in Nashville, Tennessee.

Schedule

References

Vanderbilt
Vanderbilt Commodores football seasons
Vanderbilt Commodores football